Abba b. Bizna was a Jewish Amora (scholar) of the fourth century, who is occasionally mentioned as a haggadist, and as having handed down certain halakic opinions.

References

Jews and Judaism in the Roman Empire
4th-century rabbis
Talmudists